Hollywood/Vine station is an underground rapid transit (known locally as a subway) station on the B Line of the Los Angeles Metro Rail system. It is located under below the iconic Hollywood and Vine intersection of Hollywood Boulevard and Vine Street, after which the station is named, in the Los Angeles neighborhood of Hollywood.

The central station of the three subway stops in Hollywood, within walking distance of many important Hollywood landmarks including the Capitol Records Building, CBS Columbia Square, The Fonda Theatre, Hollywood Palladium and Pantages Theatre. The station is also below the Hollywood Walk of Fame and close to the Gower Gulch.

History 
Hollywood/Vine opened on June 12, 1999, as the western terminus of the northern branch of the Red Line. Upon the opening of the westward extension to North Hollywood in 2000, it lost its title as the end of the line.

Transit-oriented development 
In accordance with Metro's initiatives to spur transit-oriented development around its stations, Hollywood/Vine has become a prime target for regeneration.

Service

Station layout 
Hollywood/Vine is a two-story station; the top level is a mezzanine with ticket machines while the bottom is the platform level. The station uses a simple island platform with two tracks.

Hours and frequency

Connections 
, the following connections are available:
 LADOT DASH: Beachwood Canyon, Hollywood, Hollywood/Wilshire

Design 

Respected Southern California based architect Adolfo E. Miralles, FAIA was selected to design this landmark station. Each B Line station was assigned a professional artist to design original art. Local Los Angeles Chicano artist Gilbert Luján (aka Magu) was selected to create the artwork for this station. "Light" was one of the central themes of the station because of its pervasiveness in Hollywood, from stars to light that passes through projectors to show films to the sun in sunny southern California. Cultural motifs in the form of So Cal cultural icons are also prevalent throughout the myriad of ceramic tiles lining the walls of the corridors as passengers descend into the railway tunnel. Benches for waiting passengers were fashioned as classic car lowriders on pedestals.

The station has, perhaps, the most detail and decorations of any station in the entire Metro system. This station is among the most pleasant and "fun" stations and tourists may find this station the most enjoyable.   Other features include two movie projectors donated by Paramount Pictures pointed towards a representation of a movie screen flanked by large curtains.   The ceiling of the station is covered with empty film reels. Pillars that provide support for the station are designed to look like palm trees, and beneath the handrail of the stairs are musical notes for the famed song "Hooray for Hollywood."  Passengers making their way to the street follow the "Yellow Brick Road" while passing many colored tiles that depict icons or represent southern California lifestyle.

References 

B Line (Los Angeles Metro) stations
Buildings and structures in Hollywood, Los Angeles
Hollywood Boulevard
Railway stations in the United States opened in 1999
1999 establishments in California